The Neda is a river in the western Peloponnese in Greece. It is unique in the sense that it is the only river in Greece with a feminine name.

It took its name from the nymph Neda.

Geography
The river begins on the southern slope of Mount Lykaion, near the village of Neda in northern Messenia. It flows to the west through a varied landscape of barren rock and forests. From near Figaleia until its mouth it forms the border of Messenia and Elis. There is a well known waterfall near the village Platania. The Neda flows into the Gulf of Kyparissia, a bay of the Ionian Sea, near the village Giannitsochori.

Places along the river
The Neda flows along the villages Neda, Kakaletri, Figaleia, Platania, Karyes and Giannitsochori.

See also
List of rivers in Greece

References

Landforms of Elis
Landforms of Messenia
Rivers of Greece
Rivers of Peloponnese (region)
Rivers of Western Greece
Drainage basins of the Ionian Sea